Millonarios Fútbol Club, also known as Millonarios, is a Colombian professional football club based in Bogotá.

It is one of the most successful and iconic clubs in Colombia, making it one of the largest sports entities in the country and one of the most important in South America. The team's origins date back to the 1920s, but it began to be called Los Millonarios in 1939 when its name was Club Deportivo Municipal. It was officially founded on 18 June 1946, as Club Deportivo Los Millonarios, and later as Millonarios Fútbol Club on 20 April 2011, when it was reconstituted as a public limited company. Since 1938, the team has played their home games at Estadio El Campín which currently holds a 36,343-capacity.

Millonarios has participated in the Categoría Primera A since its inception in 1948, being one of only three teams to have participated in all of its tournaments, along with Independiente Santa Fe and Atlético Nacional. Millonarios competes in the Clásico Capitalino against home-town rivals Independiente Santa Fe and the Clásico Añejo against Deportivo Cali and also has a strong rivalry with América de Cali. Since the start of the Colombian championship in 1948, Millonarios has won the most local titles and formed a team called the "Ballet Azul", which was a reference of great importance worldwide during the first part of the 1950s, being considered by various South American and European specialists as the best team in the world when it achieved a large number of triumphs and international achievements of great relevance and importance for the time. During this period, Millonarios had prominent figures in world football such as Alfredo Di Stéfano, Adolfo Pedernera, Néstor Rossi, and Julio Cozzi, who played crucial roles in the team's success. Di Stefano, who is widely regarded as one of the greatest footballers of all time, joined Millonarios in 1949 and played for the team until 1953. During this period, Millonarios won the Copa Colombia in 1951 and the Colombian league championship in 1949, 1951, and 1952. Among its accomplishments, the team won the first edition of the Small World Cup of Clubs in 1953, the Golden Wedding Championship against Real Madrid in 1952, which the team won at the Santiago Bernabéu Stadium, and the Duelo de Campeones Trophies in 1950 and 1951. Their participations at these tournaments gave rise team's nickname of "Ambassador" as the club was representing Colombia at these tournaments.

It is the second most successful team in Colombian football with 21 official titles, including national and international championships. The team has won 15 championships in the local Colombian League, 3 Colombian Cup titles, and 1 Colombian Super Cup title. It also won the won the Small Club World Cup in 1953, the Copa Simón Bolívar continental championship in 1972 and the last edition of the Copa Merconorte in 2001.  

According to the IFFHS, Millonarios is the fourth-best Colombian club of the 20th century and the ninth-best Colombian club of the 21st century. It has been included in lists of the best football clubs of all time made by major international sports media, being the only Colombian team present on them. By CONMEBOL's standards, Millonarios is the third-best Colombian club in international tournaments, with 396.85 points, and ranks 51st in the official ranking of Copa Libertadores clubs. It is recognized by FIFA as one of the Classic Clubs of the World and named by the organization as the First Ambassador of Colombian Football.

History

Foundation 

In 1937, a group of students from the private Catholic school Colegio Mayor de San Bartolomé, located in Bolivar Square, the historic center of Bogotá, decided to form a football team with the goal of playing against teams from other parts of the city.  The team's first matches were played on the grounds of the "La Merced" estate owned by the college at the time, where the current Colegio San Bartolomé la Merced and La Merced neighborhood now stand. Some of the young players wanted to name the team "Unión Juventud" (Youth Union), while others preferred "Unión Bogotana" (Bogotan Union). As the team began to gain popular support despite having no official backing, they alternated between the two names for each match. Eventually, they settled on the name "Juventud Bogotana," which combined both names. 

Within a year, the team had won the hearts of many fans due to their impressive victories. In a surprising turn of events, all of the players, led by their spokesperson Ignacio "Nacho" Izquierdo (the first important figure in the team's history), were called up to form Colombia's first-ever national team. The team made their debut in February of that year at the Central American and Caribbean Games in Panama City, where they won the bronze medal in a stellar performance. Upon returning from Panama and with the team on the brink of disbandment, Izquierdo saw an opportunity in the upcoming first edition of the Bolivarian Games to be held in Bogotá. He rallied the initial group of players and formed a more structured team, which once again represented the Colombian national team. The Colombian government had hired the team's coach Fernando Paternoster, a former player for the Argentine national team and runner-up in the 1930 FIFA World Cup, to coach Colombia. The team also received support from the city and was acquired by the Municipal Government and Council of Bogotá, receiving economic aid. They were then called Club Municipal de Deportes, becoming the official team of Bogotá and adopting the official colors (at that time, black and white) and crest (the current one) of the city.

Despite their sporting successes, the Municipality suspended their aid due to problems between the founders of Juventud Bogotana and Álvaro Rozo, the President of Club Municipal. The team was then taken over by the managers Manuel Briceño Pardo, Antonio José Vargas, and Santander businessman Alberto Lega (who contributed $50,000 to hire five Argentine players), who restored the team's stability. Without official economic support and without colors in their uniforms, the managers changed the team's name several times: Municipal La Salle (when it was under the control of the students of the La Salle Institute), Municipal Deportivo (when it was under the control of Briceño Pardo, Vargas, and Lega), and later Municipal Deportivo Independiente (this last name was to clarify their disengagement from the Municipality). However, the press simply referred to them as the Bogotá team or selection.

On 28 January 1939 (now with the addition of "Independiente" to their name to clarify their disengagement from the Municipality), the team made their debut with the three Argentine players against the Antioquia team, winning 5–4 with goals from Lucífero (who scored three times), Carvajal, and "Nacho" Izquierdo. This was a significant moment for football in the city, as it marked the first time that a team from Bogotá (and from the country) had played with foreign players. This was also the last year the team played under the name "Deportivo Independiente." Despite facing financial difficulties and internal conflicts among the team's founders and supporters, the Municipal Deportivo Independiente continued to compete in various tournaments, representing Bogotá and garnering significant public support. In 1946, the team merged with Club Deportivo Municipal and changed their name to Club Deportivo Los Millonarios.

Birth of the name Millonarios

In 1939, the nickname "Los Millonarios" (The Millionaires) was born when Vicente Lucífero met with the team's board of directors every Thursday to negotiate payments. At that time, the Argentine players did not have annual contracts. However, Lucífero demanded high compensation not only for the Argentinians but for the entire team. He wanted to ensure that the Colombian players' salaries matched those of the foreigners, which caused Luis Camacho Montoya, the sports editor of El Tiempo newspaper, to strongly criticize the team for its disassociation from the municipality. Montoya gave the team's leaders the label of "new rich," "Los Millonarios," because they intended to maintain the entire team with all its foreign players, requiring a lot of money.

Montoya stated, "The Argentines are very demanding; they will charge this and that amount. This is a club of millionaires; the Municipalists are now millionaires." Thus, the nickname was born, which would become its definitive name since people started to know and call the team more by the nickname "Los Millonarios" than by its actual name. It is worth noting that in 1932, seven years prior, the Argentine club River Plate had already adopted the same nickname for making big signings at that time.

On August 13, 1939, in a meeting at the "El Gato Negro" café (16th Street with Eighth Avenue), the team officially adopted the name "Los Millonarios" as part of a relaunch and re-founding of the club, which took place on that date when they defeated Deportivo Barranquilla 6–0 with goals from Luis Timón (1–0 and 5–0), Martínez, Ruiz Díaz, Zapata, and an own goal by López. During this game, they debuted their current blue uniform with grey socks, copied from the Argentine team Tigre, which had recently graced the cover of El Gráfico magazine and was the team Fernando Paternoster supported. This uniform remained the same, with the only change suggested by the leader Manuel Briceño Pardo for the next game. It consisted of changing the shorts to white and the socks to blue (due to its association with the Colombian Conservative Party) and establishing it definitively as the team's official uniform, which was further consolidated years later with the colors used by Independiente Santa Fe (referencing the Colombian Liberal Party).

The first team to be called Millonarios consisted of: Carlos Álvarez, Antenor Rodríguez (captain), Ignacio "Nacho" Izquierdo, Alfredo Cuezzo, Alfonso "Che" Piedrahíta, Óscar Sabransky, Vicente Lucífero, Antonio Ruiz Díaz, Luis Timón, José Antonio "Mico" Zapata, and Antonio Martínez.

Since its creation, Millonarios has become one of Colombia's most important teams by winning titles in amateur league tournaments, international matches, and various tours throughout the country, achieving significant triumphs. The team became the great favorite for the title from the moment the first Colombian Professional Football Championship began in 1948.

After being structured and leaving behind its past as a city select team, Millonarios entered the A.D.B. (Bogotá Sports Association) championship in 1940, which was the second-tier tournament in the Cundinamarca football league. In the same year, they won the title and ascended to the first category, in which they participated from 1941 to 1945, winning four titles (1941, 1943, 1944, 1945).

The Ballet Azul
Millonarios greatly benefited from a major players' strike in the Argentinian league in 1948, which caused a great diaspora of players towards Colombia.  The following year, Millonarios won its first league title.  

The most successful period for the club was during the early 1950s due to the notable Argentinean presence. During this period the squad was known as The Blue Ballet, which featured great players such as Alfredo di Stefano, Adolfo Pedernera, Néstor Rossi, Julio Cozzi, Antonio "Maestrico" Báez, Hugo Reyes, Reinaldo Mourin and other figures in Argentina, mainly from River Plate. Thanks to the great football these players  showed on the field, Millonarios was named by several media outlets in South America and Europe, as the best team in the world in the early 1950s. They won three straight titles from 1951 to 1953, called a "tricampeonato", and won the Copa Colombia in 1952.  

In 1951, Colombia was suspended by FIFA due to the recruitment of international players without a pass; the teams were forced to return all expatriate players that had participated in the tournament through irregular means. This edict marked the departure of di Stefano in February 1953, receiving bids from Barcelona and Real Madrid, who came to win the bid for the player. The Colombia national team was also banned from the 1954 FIFA World Cup for the same reason.

Small Club World Cup
In 1952, a group of Venezuelan sports entrepreneurs created the Small Club World Cup, a friendly competition that brought together leading European and South American teams. Millonarios was invited to participate in the 1952 and 1953 editions. In its first appearance, the team finished with seven points, behind Real Madrid (double tie 1–1) and Brazilian Botafogo (4–4 tie and defeat 0–2); the tournament was played in a two-round scheme, and involved host La Salle of Venezuela (double win 4–1 and 5–1).

In its participation in 1953, the team was crowned undefeated champion with 11 points, above River Plate of Argentina (5–1 win and 1–1 tie), Rapid Wien of Austria (double win 2–1 and 4–0) and Spanish Espanyol of Barcelona (double win 6–0 and 4–0). This friendly tournament is considered by some to be a predecessor of the Intercontinental Cup, now known as FIFA Club World Cup, though not its equivalent.

1960s and 70s 
Millonarios won their fifth league title in 1959, paving the way for a second golden era in the 1960s, where they won four titles in a row from 1961 to 1964. In the 1970s, the team won the title in 1972 and 1978, and came very close to winning it multiple times, finishing runner-up in 1973 and 1975, and third in 1974, 1976 and 1977.

1980s 
Millonarios won two more titles during this decade: the 1987 and 1988 league titles, with star players such as Arnoldo Iguarán, Mario Vanemerak, and Carlos Estrada. The 1988 title was the last title the club won before their 23-year title drought.

1990s 
The club came very close to winning the title in 1994, but America de Cali snatched it from them on the final matchday because they also won their match. Millonarios also had a good 1999 season. Although they finished outside the top ten in the Apertura, in the Finalizacion, they collected 42 points, and were undefeated during the regular season, while also setting a 29-match undefeated record, but fell in the playoffs and failed to reach qualification for the final, which was later won by Atletico Nacional.

2000s
In 2001, Millonarios won the Copa Merconorte, beating Mexican club Necaxa in the semi-finals on their way to the finals, where they beat Ecuadorian team Emelec on penalty kicks, after both legs had ended in draws. 

Millonarios had further improvement when former Manchester City assistant manager Juan Carlos Osorio was appointed as the new manager in July 2006, replacing Miguel Prince, who had led the club to a sixth-placed finish in the Apertura. Osorio led the club into the playoffs for the Finalizacion, and was one point away from making the finals in the playoffs. The club finished fifth in the aggregate table for the year, taking the club once again into the Copa Sudamericana, while the team's financial situation also had a notable recovery. 

In July 2007, Osorio left Millonarios to manage Major League Soccer side Chicago Fire, and he was replaced with Martín Lasarte; after a brief, but very unsuccessful period with Lasarte, Millonarios then hired Argentinian Mario Vanemerak as their new manager. Under Vanemerak, Millonarios began to shine again, most notably in the 2007 Copa Sudamericana. Although they had a scare in the first stage, where they just barely edged Peruvian club Coronel Bolognesi on penalties, they went on to eliminate several powerful teams, including beating rivals Nacional 3–2 and then shutting out Brazilian champions São Paulo 3–0 in the quarter-finals. Millonarios was eventually eliminated by Mexican side Club América 5–2 on aggregate to put their run to an end, but the club had a less impressive performance in the 2007 Finalizacion, finishing eleventh in the table and missing out on the playoffs. 

After Millonarios failed to qualify for the playoffs in the 2008 Apertura, Vanemerak was dismissed. He was replaced by Óscar Quintabani, who had won back to back championships with Nacional. In his first season, the 2008 Finalizacion, the club barely missed out on a playoff spot by goal difference. However, in the 2009 Apertura the club finished 15th after a very poor campaign, and Quintabani left the club shortly after. Results did not significantly improve, and the club missed out on the playoffs in the 2009 Finalizacion and both tournaments of 2010.

2010s: End of Title Drought
Plagued by financial problems, and with no major titles in the last decade, as well as having failed to qualify for the playoffs in the last seven seasons, the club finally initiated a bankruptcy process that led to it being bought by a society composed of about 4,000 fans, Azul & Blanco, SA. This movement also meant a change in playing style which started with the hiring of Venezuelan coach Richard Páez. 

Paez led the club to a sixth-placed finish in the 2011 Apertura and playoff semi-finals. The 2011 Finalizacion was even better, with the club finishing fourth in the league, and they were set to qualify for the finals after a 3–0 win against Junior in the semi-finals first leg, but Junior made a comeback in Barranquilla and tied the series, then shortly after won on penalties to eliminate Millonarios. 

However, the Millonarios fans were not left without anything to celebrate, as the club won the 2011 Copa Colombia with a great run that included a first-place finish in their group, a comeback win against Deportes Tolima in the quarter finals, and then a 4–1 away win against Junior in the semi-finals, before topping it off by winning both games against Boyacá Chicó in the finals, clinching a spot in the 2012 Copa Sudamericana while also ending a 23-year title drought.

In June 2012, it was confirmed that Hernán Torres would be the new coach after a poor Apertura campaign where the club missed out on the playoffs. In Copa Sudamericana, the team was highly successful, reaching the semi-finals after eliminating Brazilian powerhouses Palmeiras and Gremio, with Millonarios having lost the first legs both times but made comebacks, and they were eventually eliminated on away goals by runner-up, Argentine club Tigre. This came as a relief after an embarrassing 8–0 defeat to Real Madrid in a friendly match in September to honor Alfredo Di Stéfano.

Despite the Copa Sudamericana elimination and heavy defeat to Real Madrid, the team had a great performance in the 2012 Finalizacion, qualifying to the play-offs as the best team of the campaign. After a very difficult series of matches, the team finished the playoffs with ten points, equal with Deportivo Pasto, but reached the Finals on better goal difference, which were to be played against Independiente Medellín. The first leg was played at Estadio Atanasio Girardotin Medellín, and ended in a 0–0 tie. The second leg was played on 16 December 2012 in Bogotá, and ended in a 1–1 draw, sending the match to a penalty shootout, where Goalkeeper Delgado managed to save a penalty and help his team win the shootout 5–4, as well as helping Millonarios win its 14th championship, their first league title in about 24 years.

As the 2012 Finalización champion, Millonarios qualified to the 2013 Copa Libertadores group stage, where it had a poor performance. They finished last in their group, with only one win and five losses.

In the 2017 Finalización, Millonarios achieved their 15th league title after defeating  Santa Fe in a final that saw 2 goals at the ending of the second half. Said final ended with a tie, that concluded an aggregate 3–2 win over their crosstown rivals.

Rivalries
Millonarios has forged many rivalries with several teams from the league, most notably with local rivals Independiente Santa Fe. This derby is popularly called El Clásico Capitalino (The Capital Classic). It is the only local derby that has been played every season since the beginning of Colombian professional football in 1948. On September 16, 2007, Millonarios completed 100 victories in their Bogotá derby clashes against Santa Fe in the 248th derby match, which ended in a 1–0 victory. The goal was scored by Gerardo Bedoya. Currently, the number of wins for Millonarios is 125 against 90 for Santa Fe.

From March 2015 to March 2017, Millonarios maintained a nine-match unbeaten streak without losing to Santa Fe, with three draws and six victories. The most outstanding was in the 2015 Torneo Apertura, when Millonarios eliminated Santa Fe from the playoffs on the last matchday with a score of 3–1. The goals were converted by Román Torres, Fernando Uribe and Rafael Robayo.

On March 19, 2017 Millonarios cut an undefeated 22 match run by Santa Fe. Millonarios won 3–0 with goals by Andrés Cadavid, Ayron del Valle and Deiver Machado. On December 13 of the same year, the Embajador team and the Cardenal met in the final of the 2017 Finalización. In the first leg, where Millonarios were the home team, they won after a header from Matías de los Santos. In the second leg, played on December 17, Millonarios came back from an adverse result twice, first with a goal by Andrés Cadavid, and finally with one by Henry Rojas, for a 3–2 aggregate score, with which they won their 15th league championship. 

Millonarios also have strong rivalries with other teams such as Atlético Nacional, América de Cali, and Deportivo Cali. The rivalry with Nacional is often times called the most important in Colombian football, because both clubs share the most titles and are the most winning teams in the country.

Honours

 
  shared record

Performance in CONMEBOL competitions
Copa Libertadores: 17 appearances
Best: Semi-finals in 1960, 1973, 1974 - Quarter-finals in 1962, 1963, 1964, 1989, 1995

1960: Semi-finals
1962: Quarter-finals
1963: Quarter-finals
1964: Quarter-finals
1968: First Round
1973: Semi-finals

1974: Semi-finals
1976: First Round
1979: First Round
1985: First Round
1988: First Round
1989: Quarter-finals

1995: Quarter-finals
1997: Round of 16
2013: First Round
2017: Second stage
2018: Group stage

Copa Sudamericana: 4 appearances
2004: Preliminary Round
2007: Semi-finals
2012: Semi-finals
2014: First Round
2018: Round of 16

Copa Merconorte: 4 appearances
1998: Semi-finals
1999: Group Stage
2000: Finalist
2001: Champion

Players

First-team squad

Out on loan

Former players 

  Tommy Mosquera

Records

Most capped players
Source: BDFA

Last updated on: 3 October 2018

Top scorers
Source: BDFA

Last updated on: 3 October 2018

Managers

 Fernando Constancio (1946–47)
 Héctor Scarone (1947–48)
 Manuel Olivera (1948)
 Carlos Aldabe (1949–50)
 Adolfo Pedernera (1950–52)
 Néstor Rossi (1952)
 Adolfo Pedernera (1953)
 Donaldo Ross (1954–55)
 Simón Herrería (1956)
 Delfín Benítez Cáceres (1956–57)
 Gabriel Ochoa Uribe (1957–60)
 Julio Cozzi (1960–61)
 Gabriel Ochoa Uribe (1961–64)
  (1964)
 Efraín Sánchez (1964)
  (1965)
 José Carlos Bauer (1965)
 Roberto Saba (1966)
  (1966)
 Néstor Rossi (1967)
 Francisco Zuluaga (1968)
 Otto Vieira (1969–70)
  (1970)
  (1970)
 Gabriel Ochoa Uribe (1970–75)
  (1976)
 Rubén Sole (1976)
 Juan Eulogio Urriolaveitia (1976)
 Gabriel Ochoa Uribe (1977)
 Jorge Solari (1977)
 Rubén Sole (1977)
  (1978)
 Osvaldo Panzutto (1978)
  (1978)
 Pedro Dellacha (1978)
 Juan Hohberg (1979)
  (1979)
 José Varacka (1979)
 José Texeira (1980–81)
  (1981)
 Todor Veselinović (1982)
 José Pastoriza (1982)
 Juan Mujica (1983)
 Jorge Luis Pinto (1984–85)
 Eduardo Luján Manera (1985)
 Eduardo Retat (1986)
  (1987–90)
 Eduardo Retat (1991)
  (1992)
 Miguel "El Nano" Prince (Oct 10, 1992–Dec 31, 1993)
 Vladimir Popović (1994–95)
 Miguel "El Nano" Prince (1995–96)
 Eduardo Oliveros (1996–97)
 Otoniel Quintana (1997)
 Diego Umaña (1997)
 Francisco Maturana (1998–June 30, 1998)
 Jorge Luis Pinto (1998–99)
  (1999)
 Jaime Rodríguez (2000)
 Diego Umaña (2000–01)
  (2001–02)
 Petar Kosanović (2002)
  (2002)
 Cheche Hernández (2002)
  (2002)
 Norberto Peluffo (2003–04)
 Óscar Fernando Cortes (2004)
 Dragan Miranović (2004–05)
 Fernando Castro (2005)
 Miguel "El Nano" Prince (Nov 30, 2005–June 30, 2006)
 Juan Carlos Osorio (Jan 1, 2006–June 30, 2007)
 Martín Lasarte (July 1, 2007–Sept 1, 2007)
 Mario Vanemerak (Sept 4, 2007–April 11, 2008)
 Bonner Mosquera (2008)
  Óscar Héctor Quintabani (2008–09)
  (May 7, 2009 – March 25, 2010)
 Richard Páez (June 1, 2010 – June 30, 2012)
 Hernán Torres (July 1, 2012–Dec 3, 2013)
 Juan Manuel Lillo (Dec 4, 2013–Aug 31, 2014)
 Ricardo Lunari (Sept 8, 2014–Aug 25, 2015)
 Rubén Israel (Aug 27, 2015–Aug 11, 2016)
 Diego Cocca (Aug 17, 2016–Dec 21, 2016)
 Miguel Angel Russo (Dec 22, 2016–Nov 11, 2018)
 Jorge Luis Pinto (Nov 13, 2018 - Oct 30, 2019)
 Alberto Gamero (Dec 10, 2019 - )

Affiliated teams

Co-ownership 
Notes:
 The clubs are owned by Joseph Marie Oughourlian, through its investment groups, as are  'Millionarios' .

Influence in other clubs 
  Millonario del Rímac: The club was founded in December 1957 after a tour of Millionarios in Inca lands. Currently competes in the third district division of Rímac, (fourth division of Peru) at the hierarchical level. The last official rapprochement between the two institutions occurred in 1976.

Brotherhoods 
  River Plate: In the amateur age of Colombian soccer, the then known as Club Deportivo Municipal, began to bring Argentine players, so they were nicknamed ("Los Millonarios") as a mockery. Soon after, the directives decided to take that romoquete as part of their official name, which agreed with the beginning of the professional league and the now-called Millonarios continued to contract to a large extent players from River Plate, so the relationship between the clubs became recurrent. Some of the notable player transfers are: Néstor Rossi (from River to Millonarios) and Juan Gilberto Funes (from Millonarios to River).
  Real Madrid: The history between the two clubs is reflected in the 7 friendly matches in which they have faced each other since Millonarios has won 3, 3 draws have been presented and only one merengue victory has been seen. Millonarios became recognized as the only foreign club to beat the first golden generation of Real Madrid. In addition, between these two institutions, the transfer of Alfredo Di Stéfano, one of the best players in the history of world football, was presented.

References

Notes

External links

official website
Dimayor profile of the team

 
Football clubs in Colombia
Football clubs in Bogotá
Association football clubs established in 1946
1946 establishments in Colombia
Categoría Primera A clubs
Unrelegated association football clubs
Copa Merconorte winning clubs